Rippingale railway station was a station serving the villages of Rippingale, Dowsby and Dunsby, Lincolnshire on the Great Northern Railway Bourne and  railway. It opened in 1872 and closed to passengers in 1930. The section from Bourne through Rippingale to Billingborough remained open for goods until 1964.

The station building is now a private residence.

References

External links
 Rippingale station on navigable 1946 O. S. map
 ; Rippingale station on 1891 OS map.
 Village web site

Disused railway stations in Lincolnshire
Former Great Northern Railway stations
Railway stations in Great Britain opened in 1872
Railway stations in Great Britain closed in 1930